The 1995 New South Wales state election was held on 25 March 1995.

Retiring Members

Labor
 Peter Anderson MLA (Liverpool)
 Tony Aquilina MLA (St Marys)
 Don Bowman MLA (Swansea)
 Wes Davoren MLA (Lakemba)
 Geoff Irwin MLA (Fairfield)
 Keith Enderbury MLC
 Delcia Kite MLC
 Judith Walker MLC

Liberal
 Bruce Baird MLA (Northcott)

National
 Wal Murray MLA (Barwon)

Independent
 Terry Griffiths MLA (Georges River) – elected as Liberal
 John Hatton MLA (South Coast)

Legislative Assembly
Sitting members are shown in bold text. Successful candidates are highlighted in the relevant colour. Where there is possible confusion, an asterisk (*) is also used.

Legislative Council
Sitting members are shown in bold text. Tickets that elected at least one MLC are highlighted in the relevant colour. Successful candidates are identified by an asterisk (*).

See also
 Members of the New South Wales Legislative Assembly, 1995–1999
 Members of the New South Wales Legislative Council, 1995–1999

References
 
 Carr, Adam. 1995 Legislative Council results, Psephos

1995